U. S. B. Dale's Market, also known as B & S Discount Foods, is a historic commercial building located near Morganton, Burke County, North Carolina.  It was built about 1900 as a neighborhood grocery store for the Grant Dale community.  It is a one-story, rectangular, flat-roofed, brick building with a stepped parapet.  It is a rare intact example of a rural community store.

It was listed on the National Register of Historic Places in 1987.

References

Commercial buildings on the National Register of Historic Places in North Carolina
Commercial buildings completed in 1900
Buildings and structures in Burke County, North Carolina
National Register of Historic Places in Burke County, North Carolina
Retail buildings in North Carolina
Grocery store buildings